Jörg Urban (born 4 August 1964) is a German politician for the Alternative for Germany (AfD) party and has been a member of the Landtag of the Free State of Saxony since 2014. Since 2017, he has been the leader of the Alternative for Germany party in the Landtag.

Career

Urban was born in 1964 in Meißen. He completed three years of voluntary military service with the National People's Army and studied hydraulic engineering at the Dresden University of Technology.

Urban was formerly affiliated with Grüne Liga, a conservationist political party. He was also briefly a member of the Pirate Party. In 2013, Urban became a member of the far-right AfD during a run for the City Council of Dresden. Until November 2014 he was chairman of the AfD district association in Dresden. He was elected to the Landtag of Saxony in 2014 on a list seat. In 2017, he succeeded Frauke Petry as the leader of the AfD party in the state of Saxony and the leader of the AfD parliamentary group in the Landtag of Saxony. After the 2019 elections, the AfD became the second largest party in the Saxon landtag, and Urban became the Leader of the Opposition.

Personal life

Jörg Urban has lived in Dresden since 1986, is married, has three children. He is a Non-denominational Christian.

References

1964 births
Alternative for Germany politicians
Members of the Landtag of Saxony
People from Meissen
Living people